Godfrey William Ernest Candler Ashby (born 6 November 1930) is a British Anglican bishop, theologian, and academic. From 1980 to 1985, he was the eighth Bishop of St John's in the Anglican Church of Southern Africa. From 1988 to 1995, he was the Assistant Bishop of Leicester in the Church of England.

Early life
Ashby was educated at The King's School, a private school in Chester, Cheshire. He studied at King's College London, and graduated in 1954 with a Bachelor of Divinity (BD) degree and the Associateship of King's College (AKC).
He also became a Doctor of Philosophy (PhD).

Ordained ministry
Ashby was ordained in the Church of England as a deacon in 1955 and as a priest in 1956. His first post was as a Curate in the Parish of St Helier in the Diocese of Southwark.

In 1958, Ashby emigrated to South Africa. Here he rose steadily in the church hierarchy, being successively: Subwarden of St Paul's College, Grahamstown; Rector of Alice, Eastern Cape; a senior lecturer in Hebrew at Rhodes University; Dean of Grahamstown and Archdeacon in the Diocese of Grahamstown.

Episcopal ministry
In 1980, Ashby was consecrated a bishop. From 1980 to 1985, he served as Bishop of St John's, the diocesan bishop. He was then professor of Divinity at the University of the Witwatersrand.

In 1988, Ashby moved back to England. He served as the Assistant Bishop of Leicester in the Diocese of Leicester from 1988 to 1995. Additionally, he was Priest-in-Charge of All Saints, Newtown Linford between 1992 and 1995. In 1993, he was made an Honorary Canon of Leicester Cathedral; in 1988, he was an assistant bishop of the Anglican Diocese of Johannesburg.

Ashby retired from full-time ministry in 1995. He returned to South Africa, where he served as an Assistant Bishop in the Diocese of George. In 2008, he returned to England, and is now an Honorary Assistant Bishop. He served in the Diocese of Portsmouth between 2008 and 2011. He has served in the Diocese of Exeter since 2011.

Personal life
Bishop Ashby was married to Valerie "Sally" Ashby, née Hawtree (she died on 7 October 2015). Together, they had six children: Garmon, John-Mark, Mary, Philip, Ruth, and Charles.

Publications

References 

1930 births
People educated at The King's School, Chester
Alumni of King's College London
Associates of King's College London
Academic staff of Rhodes University
Anglican archdeacons in Africa
Anglican bishops of St John's
20th-century Anglican Church of Southern Africa bishops
Assistant bishops of Leicester (1987–2017)
Academic staff of the University of the Witwatersrand
Living people
Deans of Grahamstown
Academic staff of St Paul's College, Grahamstown